Philippe-Charles, Duke of Anjou (5 August 1668 – 10 July 1671) was the fifth child and second son of King Louis XIV of France and Maria Theresa of Spain, and as such was a fils de France.

Life
Philippe-Charles de France was born at the Château de Saint-Germain-en-Laye, near Paris, and titled duc d'Anjou at birth, a title previously held by Philippe de France, duc d'Orléans, his uncle and the younger brother of Louis XIV.

As a younger son of Louis XIV, Philippe-Charles was not expected to become the Dauphin; however, it was hoped he would inherit the vast fortune of his second cousin, Anne Marie Louise d'Orléans, Duchess of Montpensier, who had no children. According to Nancy Mitford, the Queen, his mother, suggested it many times. While at Saint-Germain-en-Laye, Philippe-Charles died of a chest infection, like his elder sister, Anne-Élisabeth de France had died six years before his birth. Upon his death, the appanage of the Duchy of Anjou reverted to the Crown, and was given to his younger brother, Louis François. Philippe-Charles was buried on 12 July 1671, at the Basilica of Saint-Denis.

At the death of the Duchess of Montpensier in 1693, her fortune went to her direct and legal heir, the House of Orléans (Philippe's uncle Philippe I, Duke of Orléans).

Ancestry

Footnotes

References

1668 births
1671 deaths
17th-century French people
People from Saint-Germain-en-Laye
Dukes of Anjou
Courtesy dukes
Princes of France (Bourbon)
Burials at the Basilica of Saint-Denis
Children of Louis XIV
Royalty and nobility who died as children
Sons of kings